Walter Stuart Diehl (3 December 1893 – 21 November 1976) was an American naval officer and aeronautical engineer.

Early life
Diehl was born in Jonesborough, Tennessee, on 3 December 1893,  as the oldest child of Wiliam P. and Lydia Showalter Diehl.  He lived in Jonesborough until he served in the United States Navy during World War I, in which the United States participated from 6 April 1917 to 11 November 1918.

Personal life
Diehl married Zulime Summers (1895-1974) in 1923 in Washington, D.C. They had two children, Zulime Whitney Diehl, born 19 April 1925, and Walter Colburn Diehl, born 22 February 1930. Zulime Whitney Diehl died in 1956.

Career
Diehl was a pioneer of aerodynamics and aircraft design. Serving in the U.S. Navys Bureau of Aeronautics, he directed the Navy's work in aerodynamics and hydrodynamics from 1918 until 1951. He was responsible for the funding, programs, and facilities of the Aerodynamics Laboratory. The author of the authoritative Engineering Aerodynamics, he actively participated in and strongly influenced continuing advances in aerodynamics and hydrodynamics.

Diehl initiated action that led to establishment of the David W. Taylor Model Basin at Carderock, Maryland, the Aircraft Research Station at Chincoteague, Virginia, and the U.S. Navys test flight unit at Naval Air Station Anacostia in Washington, D.C., which later developed into the Naval Air Test Center at Naval Air Station Patuxent River, Maryland.

Retirement and death

Diehl retired from the Navy in 1951 as a captain. He died in Washington D. C. on 21 November 1976, and is buried at Arlington National Cemetery in Arlington, Virginia.

Commemoration
A U.S. Navy fleet replenishment oiler, was named for Diehl. She was christened in his honor in New Orleans, Louisiana, on 10 October 1987 and entered non-commissioned service as a United States Naval Ship with the Military Sealift Command on 13 September 1988. She remains in active service.

References

External links
Walter Stuart Diehl
NavSource Online: Service Ship Photo Archive: USNS Walter S. Diehl (T-AO-193)
Photos of Diehl's burial place and headstone at Find-A-Grave

1893 births
1976 deaths
United States Navy officers
American aerospace engineers
People from Jonesborough, Tennessee
Burials at Arlington National Cemetery
20th-century American engineers